Schauer is a German surname. Notable people with the surname include:

 Amy Schauer (1871–1956), Australian cookery instructor and author
 Anton G. Schauer (1860–1932), American politician
Austen Schauer, member of North Dakota House of Representatives
 David A. Schauer, the current Executive Director of the National Council on Radiation Protection and Measurements
 Frederick Schauer (born 1946), American legal scholar
 Henry Schauer (1918–1997), a United States Army soldier
 Johannes Conrad Schauer (1813–1848), a botanist interested in Spermatophytes
 Maria Schauer, Austrian, Righteous Among the Nations
 Mark Schauer (born 1961), an American Congressman from Michigan
 Mitch Schauer (born 1955), a television professional
 Rube Schauer (1891–1957), a Major League Baseball player
 Stefan Schauer (born 1983), German ice hockey player

See also 
 Joseph Schauers (1909–1987), an American rower
 Schauer Lake, a lake in Sibley County, Minnesota
 an actor in the 1920 French silent film Face à l'Océan
 Schauer-Romantik
 Pat Schauer Rookie of the Year
 Schauren
 Scheuer, Scheuermann

German-language surnames